Haji Kazim Yazdani a historical researcher and a writer, was born in a Hazara family in central Afghanistan. He is among the top historical researchers and writers in the country. His work has been published in many articles and books. He is a well-respected writer as he did not use his research and written work as a way to earn income.

See also 
 List of Hazara people
 Faiz Mohammad Katib Hazara
 Hassan Poladi
 Sayed Askar Mousavi

References

External links 
 Kabul Press – Haji Kazim Yazdani

Living people
1948 births
Hazara writers
Hazara historians
Hazara people